Ignjat Đurđević (also Ignazio Giorgi; February 1675 – 21 January 1737) was a baroque poet and translator from the Republic of Ragusa, best known for his long poem Uzdasi Mandaljene pokornice ("Sighs of Repentant Magdalene"). He wrote poetry in three languages: Latin, Italian and Croatian.

Biography
Đurđević was born in Ragusa to Bernardo Giorgi and Teresa Zlatarić. He did not belong to the House of Giorgi, but to a minor, recently ennobled, family, the Giorgi di Bernardo. He was a member of the Great Council (1693), duke of Šipan Island (1695) and Lovrijenac fortress captain (1696).

As a member of a rich and respectable family, he lived recklessly and often in debauchery. His love adventures cost him the position of the duke on Šipan. Because of his unrequited love towards a diklica (girl) from Dubrovnik and a libertine poem he wrote to her, Đurđević even had to leave the city for a while. In 1698 he joined Jesuits in Rome where he completed philosophy studies and worked as a teacher. In 1706 he joined Benedictines in Dubrovnik, but was expelled from the city between 1710 and 1712 when he lived in Rome and Napoli.

He was a tri-lingual poet (he wrote in Latin, Italian and Croatian) with deep feelings, unrestrained by Catholic morals. His fiery Ljuvene pjesni (Love Poems) are some of the best lyric poems from Dubrovnik, with influences of Bunić's verse. Suze Marunkove (Marunko's Tears), Đurđević's poem about Marunko from the island of Mljet, who is sighing because of a beautiful djevičina (maid) Pavica, were obviously inspired by Derviš, written by his namesake Stijepan Đurđević. Still, Ignjat often manages to surpass Stijepan because of his freer style.

After more than twenty years of preparations, Đurđević printed Uzdasi Mandaljene pokornice ("Sighs of Repentant Magdalene") in Venice in 1728, together with the cycle of Pjesni razlike (Various Poems). Magdalene is his most beautiful work, while Poems have exceptionally varied themes and forms. Experts in Croatian literature like Mihovil Kombol and Ivo Frangeš noticed that the themes and forms of Đurđević's Poems are similar to the poems of Fran Krsto Frankopan.

In 1729, his Saltijer slovinski (Slavic Psalms) were printed in Venice. They contain translations or paraphrases of the psalms of King David. Their fine language and style distinguish them from many similar translations made by the poets of Dubrovnik.

Ethnicity
His father was Bernardo Giorgi, and his mother was Tereza Zlatarić. He did not belong to the old Đurđević family from Dubrovnik, originally from Rome, but to another family of the same name that received a noble title a few years before Ignjat's birth. His mother is from the Serbian Zlatarić family. In his book Macedonia, on page 78, Tihomir Đorđević states that the Zlatarićs came to Dubrovnik from Macedonia, referring to the well-known Dubrovnik Catholic Serb, the linguist Pero Budmani. Đurđević once wrote that "Zlatarići are of Serbian origin", and Ivan Kukuljević Sakcinski that they are from Mysis orte parentibus. Dragoljub Pavlović found a document in the Dubrovnik archives stating that the Zlatarićs came from Srebrenica in Bosnia.
Đurđević mentioned several times in his legacy a Catholic manual in the "Serbian language" (lingua serviana), written in Cyrillic.

Publications
Sighs of Repentant Magdalene (Uzdasi Mandaljene Pokornice), 1728

See also
 List of notable Ragusans
 Dalmatia
 History of Dalmatia

References

External links

 Ignjat Đurđević: Suze Marunkove and Uzdasi Mandalijene pokornice

18th-century Croatian poets
People from the Republic of Ragusa
People from Dubrovnik
1675 births
1737 deaths
Croatian male poets
Lyric poets
Croatian translators
Baroque writers
18th-century male writers
Croatian-language writers
Italian-language writers
New Latin-language poets